Aviation Week & Space Technology, often abbreviated Aviation Week or AW&ST, is the flagship magazine of the Aviation Week Network. The weekly magazine is available in print and online, reporting on the aerospace, defense and aviation industries, with a core focus on aerospace technology. It has a reputation for its contacts inside the United States military and industry organizations.

Aviation Week was a favorite conduit for defense-related companies and labs to leak information to the public as part of their policy by press release efforts. This led to it being informally referred to "Aviation Leak and Space Mythology".

History
The magazine was first published in August 1916. Early editors Ladislas d'Orsy and Donald W. McIlhiney (1921 to 25) were Quiet Birdmen. Publisher (1927 to 29) Earl D. Osborn was also a Quiet Birdman. With the coming of the Space Age, the current title was adopted in 1960.

Other titles the magazine has held include Aviation & Aircraft Journal (1920–1921), Aviation (1922–1947), Aviation Week (1947–1958), Aviation Week Including Space Technology (1958–1959).

Starting in August 1943, McGraw-Hill published a weekly magazine called Aviation News to accompany the standard monthly issue. In 1947, its staff was reincorporated into the now renamed Aviation Week.

Editions
Once a month the magazine publishes an edition targeted at the maintenance, repair and overhaul business.

Ownership and related products
Aviation Week & Space Technology is published by Aviation Week Network, a division of Informa. The magazine is headquartered in New York and its main editorial office is in Washington, DC.

Its longest run of ownership came when it was owned by McGraw-Hill. It was sold by McGraw Hill to Penton in 2013. It became part of Informa when Informa purchased Penton in 2016.

Aviation Week Network also publishes Business & Commercial Aviation and Air Transport World magazines.

Notable stories

Nuclear bomber hoax
The 1 December 1958 issue of Aviation Week included an article, "Soviets Flight Testing Nuclear Bomber", that claimed that the Soviets had made great progress in their own nuclear aircraft program. This was accompanied by an editorial on the topic as well. The magazine claimed that the aircraft was real beyond a doubt, stating that "A nuclear-powered bomber is being flight tested in the Soviet Union. ... It has been observed both in flight and on the ground by a wide variety of foreign observers from Communist and non-Communist countries." In reality, however, the article was a hoax. The aircraft in the photographs was later revealed to be an M-50 bomber and not a nuclear-powered plane at all.

Soviet reusable space shuttle
After finding a December 1976 Titan IIID launch was for a secret KH-11 spy satellite, Aviation Week & Space Technology editor Craig Covault agreed with the  Chairman of the Joint Chiefs of Staff, Gen. David C. Jones to hold on the story, but received details on the Buran programme which were published on March 20, 1978. It revealed progressively the KeyHole Story after William Kampiles sold the KH-11 manual to a Soviet spy.

SR-72 (Son of Blackbird) revealing
The SR-72 is the proposed successor to the SR-71 Blackbird. There were unconfirmed rumors about the SR-72 dating back to 2007, when various sources disclosed that Lockheed Martin was developing a Mach 6 plane for the US Air Force. Such a development was confirmed on 1 November 2013, when the Skunk Works revelations were published about the development work on the SR-72 exclusively in Aviation Week & Space Technology. The magazine dubbed it 'The Son of Blackbird'. Public attention to the news was large enough to overwhelm the Aviation Week servers.

New, classified unmanned aircraft flying at Area 51 uncovering
In a December 9, 2013 cover story, Aviation Week & Space Technology revealed details about a highly classified intelligence, surveillance and reconnaissance stealth unmanned aircraft – the RQ-180 – that has been developed in secret by Northrop Grumman. The aircraft is currently flying at Area 51 in the Nevada desert and will become operational by 2015.

Lockheed Martin's secret Compact Fusion Reactor project details
In October 2014, Lockheed Martin's Skunk Works research lab gave Aviation Week editor Guy Norris access to a previously secret initiative to develop a compact fusion reactor that is small enough to power interplanetary spacecraft, ships and ultimately large aircraft that would virtually never require refueling. If successful, the groundbreaking project could shake up the global energy industry.

Vladimir Putin named Person of the Year
On its January 16, 2015 cover, Aviation Week & Space Technology named Russian President Vladimir Putin "The Notorious Mr. Putin - Person Of The Year." On its website, the magazine said  that "no other person has had a more sweeping impact on aerospace and aviation—for better or worse—than Russian President Vladimir Putin. And for all but the most cynical of observers, Putin’s far-reaching impact has definitely been for the worse. Because of this, he is Aviation Week's 2014 Person of the Year." The controversial issue caused a backlash among readers on its comments section and on social media.

Past editors
The editors-in-chief of Aviation Week & Space Technology (and its past titles) have been:

Publishers

See also
 Air & Cosmos, a similar French-language magazine from France
 Flight International, another aerospace sector industry journal
 Jane's Defence Weekly, another defense sector journal
 Air Transport World, sister publication of Aviation Week & Space Technology, focused on serving the airline management community.

References

External links
 
 Aviation Week Magazine – Digitized issues from 1 August 1916 to 30 December 1963 on the Internet Archive

Aviation magazines
English-language magazines
Magazines established in 1916
Magazines published in New York City
Military magazines published in the United States
Weekly magazines published in the United States
Space Age